Daniel Brodin (born 9 February 1990) is a Swedish professional ice hockey right winger who is currently playing for Djurgårdens IF Hockey in the HockeyAllsvenskan (Allsv). Brodin has represented Sweden internationally at the 2010 World Junior Championships. He was drafted by the Toronto Maple Leafs, who selected him in the fifth round of the 2010 NHL Entry Draft.

Playing career
Brodin participated in the 2006 TV-pucken, playing for Stockholm Röd. He scored one goal and two points but couldn't help the team get promoted to the playoffs. He played the rest of the 2006–07 season in Almtuna IS' J20 team. He moved to Djurgårdens IF the following season, where he played in Djurgården's J18 team for most of the season.

Brodin was promoted to the J20 team for the 2008–09 season. The team made it to the playoffs but was beaten by Brynäs IF in the semifinals. Brodin joined Djurgården's senior team as an extra player for the away game against Luleå HF on 12 February 2009, but did not get any time on the ice. He made his real Elitserien debut against Modo Hockey on 10 November 2009, two days later on 12 November, he scored his first point, an assist to Marcus Krüger who scored the 2–2 goal against Luleå HF. Brodin scored the 2–1 goal in the derby against Södertälje SK on 14 November 2009. It proved to be the game-winning goal and was also his first goal in Elitserien.

Brodin was selected by the Toronto Maple Leafs in the fifth round of the 2010 NHL Entry Draft. Brodin signed a two-year extension with Djurgården on 4 March 2011.

On 3 May 2019, Brodin joined HC Fribourg-Gottéron of the National League (NL) on a one-year deal worth CHF 650,000.

International play

Brodin was named for Team Sweden by Pär Mårts, coach of Sweden's national junior hockey team, for the 2010 World Junior Ice Hockey Championships, despite only having played nine Elitserien games at the time.

He replaced Niklas Nordgren, who suffered from a minor concussion, in the 2010 Karjala Cup. Team Sweden's last game in the tournament against Finland was Brodin's first game in the senior national team. He was called up again for Team Sweden for the 2010 Channel One Cup.

Personal
In July 2017, Brodin married his childhood sweetheart Emilia Appelqvist, a professional soccer player for Djurgårdens IF DFF and the Sweden women's national football team. In September 2018 Emilia gave birth to the couple's first child, a daughter named Mila Ida Brodin.

Career statistics

Regular season and playoffs

International

References

External links
 

1990 births
Living people
Ässät players
Brynäs IF players
Djurgårdens IF Hockey players
HC Fribourg-Gottéron players
Swedish ice hockey right wingers
Toronto Maple Leafs draft picks
Ice hockey players at the 2022 Winter Olympics
Olympic ice hockey players of Sweden
Ice hockey people from Stockholm